Mus mayori is a species of rodent in the genus Mus, the mice. Its common names include Mayor's mouse, highland rat, and spiny mouse. It is endemic to Sri Lanka.

This mouse lives in tropical and subtropical forest types and wet grassland habitat. It is fossorial, seeking shelter by digging burrows. It is nocturnal.

This species is widespread in parts of Sri Lanka but it faces a number of threats, including deforestation and domestic cats.

There are two subspecies, M. m. mayori and M. m. pococki. A recent study catalogued the parasites associated with subspecies pococki: a mite of genus Echinolaelaps, a tick of genus Ixodes, and the sucking louse Polyplax spinulosa. A new species of pseudoscorpion was found on the mouse, described, and named Megachernes kanneliyensis. The mouse also carries the native Sri Lankan flea Stivalius phoberus.

References

External links
Wilson, D. E. & Reeder, D. M. Mus (Coelomys) mayori. Mammal Species of the World. Third Edition. Johns Hopkins University Press.

Mus (rodent)
Rodents of Sri Lanka
Endemic fauna of Sri Lanka
Mammals described in 1915
Taxa named by Oldfield Thomas
Taxonomy articles created by Polbot